Louis Marshall Jones (October 20, 1913 – February 19, 1998), known professionally as Grandpa Jones, was an American banjo player and "old time" country and gospel music singer. He is a member of the Country Music Hall of Fame.

Biography
Jones was born in the small farming community of Niagara in Henderson County, Kentucky, the youngest of 10 children in a sharecropper's family. His father was an old-time fiddle player, and his mother was a ballad singer and herself adept on the concertina. His first instrument was guitar. Ramona Riggins, one of several women who began to gain some recognition in a musical form long dominated by men was Grandpa's wife and musical partner of over thirty years. Ramona first started playing the mandolin when she was six or seven years old. Jones spent his teenage years in Akron, Ohio, where he began singing country music tunes on a radio show on WJW. In 1931, Jones joined the Pine Ridge String Band, which provided the musical accompaniment for the very popular Lum and Abner show. By 1935 his pursuit of a musical career took him to WBZ radio in Boston, Massachusetts, where he met musician/songwriter Bradley Kincaid, who gave him the nickname "Grandpa Jones" when he was 22 years old, because of his off-stage grumpiness at early-morning radio shows. Jones liked the name and decided to create a stage persona based around it. Later in life, he lived in Mountain View, Arkansas. In the 1940s he met rising country radio star Cousin Emmy, from whom he learned to play the banjo.

Career
Performing as Grandpa Jones, he played the guitar or banjo, yodeled, and sang mostly old-time ballads. By 1937, Jones had made his way to West Virginia, where Cousin Emmy taught Jones the art of the clawhammer style of banjo playing, which gave a rough backwoods flavor to his performances.  First experience playing music in public came at the age of 11 or thereabouts The music of the WLS Barn Dance in Chicago was a major influence on Louis, as were the Jimmie Rodgers records his sister brought home.  In 1942, Jones joined WLW in Cincinnati, Ohio. It was there that he met fellow Kentuckian Merle Travis. In 1943, they made their recording debuts together for Syd Nathan's upstart King Records. Jones was making records under his own name for King by 1944 and had his first hit with "It's Raining Here This Morning."

His recording career was put on hold when he enlisted in the United States Army during World War II. Discharged in 1946, he recorded again for King. Through 1946-1949, when he and several Opry cast members (Clyde Moody and Chubby Wise among them) were invited to become a part of the burgeoning world of television by Washington D.C. entrepreneur Connie B Gay, he became a cast member at the Old Dominion Barn Dance, broadcast over WRVA in Richmond, Virginia. In March 1946, he moved to Nashville, Tennessee, and started performing on the Grand Ole Opry. He married Ramona Riggins on October 14, 1946. As an accomplished performer herself, she would take part in his performances. Jones' vaudeville humor was a bridge to television. His more famous songs include "T For Texas," "Are You From Dixie," "Night Train To Memphis," "Mountain Dew," and "Eight More Miles To Louisville."

In the fall of 1968, Jones became a charter cast member on the long-running television show Hee Haw, often responding to the show's skits with his trademark phrase "Outrageous." He also played banjo, by himself or with banjo player David "Stringbean" Akeman. A musical segment featured in the early years had Jones and "his lovely wife Ramona" singing while ringing bells held in their hands and strapped to their ankles. A favorite skit had off-camera cast members ask, "Hey Grandpa, what's for supper?" in which he would describe a delicious, country-style meal, often in a rhyming, talking blues style. Sometimes he would describe something not so good; i.e. "Because you were bad, thawed out TV dinners!"

Testimony
A resident of rural Ridgetop, Tennessee, outside Nashville, he was a neighbor and friend of fellow musician David "Stringbean" Akeman. On the morning of November 11, 1973, Jones discovered the bodies of Akeman and his wife, Estelle, who had been murdered during the night by robbers. Jones testified at the trial of the killers, his testimony helping to secure a conviction.

Honors
In 1978, Jones was inducted into the Country Music Hall of Fame. His autobiography, Everybody's Grandpa: Fifty Years Behind The Mike was published in 1984.

Death

In January 1998, Jones suffered two strokes after his second show performance at the Grand Ole Opry. He died at 7:00 p.m. Central Time on February 19, 1998, at the McKendree Village Home Health Center in Hermitage, Tennessee, at age 84. He was buried in the Luton Memorial Methodist Church cemetery in Goodlettsville, Tennessee.

Discography
Jones recorded for several labels, including RCA Victor, King Records and Monument.
Grandpa Jones Sings His Greatest Hits (1954)
 Country Music Hall of Fame Series (1992) MCA
Grandpa Jones & The Brown's Ferry Four 16 Sacred Gospel Songs, King Records
Grandpa Jones Yodeling Hits (1963) Monument
Grandpa Jones Remembers The Brown's Ferry Four  (1966) Monument
Grandpa Jones Live (1970) Monument

Singles

References

Other
Wolfe, Charles K. (1998). "Grandpa Jones". In The Encyclopedia of Country Music. Paul Kingsbury (editor), New York: Oxford University Press. pp. 269–70.

External links
 Profile, CMT.com 
 
 
 Jones profile, Country Music Hall of Fame and Museum website 
 Grandpa Jones with the Delmore Brothers

1913 births
1998 deaths
American country singer-songwriters
American country banjoists
Country Music Hall of Fame inductees
People from Henderson County, Kentucky
Grand Ole Opry members
King Records artists
RCA Victor artists
Monument Records artists
Musicians from Akron, Ohio
People from Mountain View, Arkansas
20th-century American singers
Country musicians from Kentucky
Bluegrass musicians from Kentucky
Singer-songwriters from Kentucky
Folk musicians from Kentucky
Singer-songwriters from Ohio
Singer-songwriters from Arkansas
American United Methodists
People from Ridgetop, Tennessee
Country musicians from Tennessee
Country musicians from Arkansas
Country musicians from Ohio
20th-century Methodists
Singer-songwriters from Tennessee